Wachusett Mountain may refer to:

 Mount Wachusett, the highest point in Worcester County, Massachusetts
 Wachusett Mountain (ski area), the name of a ski area on the same mountain